Easy is an American comedy-drama anthology series written, directed, edited and produced by Joe Swanberg. It consists of 25 half-hour episodes. The series is set in Chicago.

The first season was released on Netflix on September 22, 2016. In April 2017, Swanberg revealed the series had been renewed for a second season, which was released on December 1, 2017. In August 2018, the series was renewed for a third and final season that premiered on May 10, 2019.

Background 
Easy follows several individuals living in Chicago who are trying to navigate issues such as love, relationships, and general knowledge. A review described the series as a microscopic portrayal of the different varieties of modern love. It has an episodic anthology format, with standalone episodes that do not require previous ones to watch. The series does include recurring narratives such as the story of the married couple Kyle (Michael Chernus) and Andi (Elizabeth Reaser), which was first introduced in Season 1. The story was revisited in Season 2 and Season 3, with their respective episodes focusing on the development and effects of their decision to enter into an open relationship. While some characters were created completely from scratch by the producers, others, such as Odinaka Malachi Ezeokoli, Karley Sciortino, and Jane Adams's characters in Season 2, are based on the real-life personas, personalities, and/or jobs of the individuals cast in the roles.

Cast

 Jane Adams as Annabelle Jones (season 1–3)
 Zazie Beetz as Noelle (season 1–3)
 Michael Chernus as Kyle (season 1–3)
 Kiersey Clemons as Chase (season 1–3)
 Aya Cash as Sherri (season 1–3)
 Megan Ferguson as Samantha (season 2–3)
 Dave Franco as Jeff (season 1–3)
 Stephen George as Stephen (season 1–2)
 Evan Jonigkeit as Matt (season 1–3)
 Danielle Macdonald as Grace (season 2–3)
 Marc Maron as Jacob Malco (season 1–3)
 Kate Micucci as Annie (season 1–3)
 Elizabeth Reaser as Andi (season 1–3)
 Jacqueline Toboni as Jo (season 1–3)
 Jaz Sinclair as Amber (season 1–3)
 Marz Timms as Van Howard (season 1–2)
 Jake Johnson as Andrew (season 1, 3)
 Gugu Mbatha-Raw as Sophie (season 1, 3)
 Aislinn Derbez as Gabi (season 1–2)
 Rebecca Spence as Cheryl (season 1, 3)

Guest

Season 1

 Suzanne Adent as Penny
 Malin Åkerman as Lucy
 Andrew Bachelor as Andrew
 Orlando Bloom as Tom
 Hannibal Buress as Jason
 Raúl Castillo as Bernie
 Noah Hopkins as Russ
 Mauricio Ochmann as Martin
 Emily Ratajkowski as Allison Lizowska
 Lucas Von Kampen as Allan
 Jake Weber as Wally
 Arthur Agee as himself

Season 2

 Aubrey Plaza as Lindsay
 Lawrence Michael Levine as Harrison
 Joe Lo Truglio as Mike
 Michaela Watkins as Karen Treska
 Judy Greer as Gretchen
 Danny Masterson as Annie's boyfriend
 Kate Berlant as Lauren
 Karley Sciortino as Sally
 Jennifer Kim as Annie
 Lindsay Burdge as Amy
 Odinaka Ezeokoli as himself
 Alex Ross Perry as Mr. Pope
 Parker Sawyers as Jason
 Kate Lyn Sheil as Annie's roommate
 Timothy Simons as Chris Whitman
 Craig Butta as Frank Bruno

Season 3
 Lydia House as Lydia
 Sophia Bush as Alexandria
 John Gallagher Jr. as Lucas
 Melanie Lynskey as Beth
 Kali Skrap as Skrap
 Kris Swanberg as Kris
 Nicky Excitement as Hugh
 Cliff Chamberlain as Ryan

Production
In March 2016, it was announced Netflix had ordered a season of eight episodes, with Joe Swanberg writing and directing the series, with Michael Chernus, Marc Maron, Elizabeth Reaser, Gugu Mbatha-Raw, Jake Johnson, Aya Cash, Dave Franco, Jane Adams, Hannibal Buress, Kiersey Clemons, Orlando Bloom, and Malin Åkerman starring.

Episodes
Some characters appear in one or more episodes as the protagonist, and in other episodes as background characters.

Season 1 (2016)

Season 2 (2017)

Season 3 (2019)

Reception
The first season of Easy received positive reviews from film critics. It holds an 85% approval rating on review aggregation website Rotten Tomatoes, based on 26 reviews, with an average rating of 7.53/10. On Metacritic, the season holds a rating of 72 out of 100, based on reviews from 10 critics, indicating "generally favorable reviews".

The show's second season received similar reviews. On Rotten Tomatoes, it holds an 86% approval rating based on 14 critical reviews, with an average rating of 9/10.

References

External links
 
 

2010s American LGBT-related comedy television series
2010s American LGBT-related drama television series
2010s American comedy-drama television series
2010s American sex comedy television series
2016 American television series debuts
2019 American television series endings
2010s American anthology television series
Lesbian-related television shows
English-language Netflix original programming
Spanish-language television programming in the United States
Television shows filmed in Illinois
Television shows set in Chicago
Spanish-language Netflix original programming